William Roderick "Tex" Jones (August 4, 1885 – February 26, 1938) was a Major League Baseball player. Jones for the Chicago White Sox in the 1911 season. In nine games, he had six hits in 31 at-bats, with four RBIs. He batted and threw right-handed.

He was born in Marion, Kansas, and died in Wichita, Kansas.

External links

1885 births
1938 deaths
Baseball players from Kansas
Chicago White Sox players
Fort Scott Giants players
Guthrie Senators players
Webb City Goldbugs players
Enid Railroaders players
Little Rock Travelers players
St. Joseph Drummers players
Buffalo Bisons (minor league) players
Des Moines Boosters players
Wichita Witches players
Wichita Jobbers players